Zuni  (also formerly Zuñi, endonym Shiwiʼma) is a language of the Zuni people, indigenous to western New Mexico and eastern Arizona in the United States. It is spoken by around 9,500 people, especially in the vicinity of Zuni Pueblo, New Mexico, and much smaller numbers in parts of Arizona.

Unlike most indigenous languages in the United States, Zuni is still spoken by a significant number of children and, thus, is comparatively less threatened with language endangerment. Edmund Ladd reported in 1994 that Zuni is still the main language of communication in the pueblo and is used in the home (Newman 1996).

The Zuni name for their own language,   (shiwi "Zuni" + -ʼma "vernacular"; pronounced ) can be translated as "Zuni way", whereas its speakers are collectively known as ʼA꞉shiwi (ʼa꞉(w)- "plural" + shiwi "Zuni").

Classification
Zuni is considered a language isolate. The Zuni have, however, borrowed a number of words from Keres, Hopi, and O’odham pertaining to religion and religious observances.

A number of possible relationships of Zuni to other languages have been proposed by various researchers, although none of these has gained general acceptance. The main hypothetical proposals have been connections with Penutian (and Penutioid and Macro-Penutian), Tanoan, and Hokan phyla, and also the Keresan languages.

The most clearly articulated hypothesis is Newman's (1964) connection to Penutian, but even this was considered by Newman (according to Michael Silverstein) to be a tongue-in-cheek work due to the inherently problematic nature of the methodology used in Penutian studies (Goddard 1996). Newman's cognate sets suffered from common problems in comparative linguistics, such as comparing commonly borrowed forms (e.g. "tobacco"), forms with large semantic differences (e.g. "bad" and "garbage", "horse" and "hoof"), nursery forms, and onomatopoetic forms (Campbell 1997). Zuni was also included under Morris Swadesh's Penutioid proposal and Joseph Greenberg's very inclusive Penutian sub-grouping – both without convincing arguments (Campbell 1997).

Zuni was included as being part of the Aztec-Tanoan language family within Edward Sapir's heuristic 1929 classification (without supporting evidence). Later discussions of the Aztec-Tanoan hypothesis usually excluded Zuni (Foster 1996).

Karl-Heinz Gursky published problematic unconvincing evidence for a Keresan-Zuni grouping. J. P. Harrington wrote one unpublished paper with the title "Zuñi Discovered to be Hokan" (Campbell 1997).

Language contact

As Zuni is a language in the Pueblo linguistic area, it shares a number of features with Hopi, Keresan, and Tanoan (and to a lesser extent Navajo) that are probably due to language contact. The development of ejective consonants in Zuni may be due to contact with Keresan and Tanoan languages which have complete series of ejectives. Likewise, aspirated consonants may have diffused into Zuni. Other shared traits include: final devoicing of vowels and sonorant consonants, dual number, ceremonial vocabulary, and the presence of a labialized velar  (Campbell 1997).

Phonology

The 16 consonants of Zuni (with IPA phonetic symbol when different from the orthography) are the following:

{| class="wikitable" style="text-align: center"
|-
! rowspan="2" |
! rowspan="2" | Bilabial
! colspan="2" | Dental/Alveolar
! rowspan="2" | Post-alveolar
! rowspan="2" | Palatal
! colspan="2" | Velar
! rowspan="2" | Glottal
|-class=small !
! central
! lateral
! plain
! labial
|-
! | Nasal
|  ||  || || || || || ||
|-
! Plosive
|  ||  || || || ||   ||   ||  
|-
! Affricate
| ||  || ||    || || || ||
|-
! Fricative
| ||  ||   ||   || || || || 
|-
! Approximant
| || ||  || ||   || ||  ||
|}

The vowels are the following:

{| class="wikitable" style="text-align: center"
!
! Front
! back
|-
! High
| 
| 
|-
! Mid
| 
| 
|-
! Low
| colspan="2" | 
|}

Zuni syllables have the following specification:

 C(C)V(ː)(C)(C)

Morphology
Word order in Zuni is fairly free with a tendency toward SOV. There is no case-marking on nouns. Verbs are complex, compared to nouns, with loose incorporation. Like other languages in the Southwest, Zuni employs switch-reference.

Newman (1965, 1996) classifies Zuni words according to their structural morphological properties (namely the presence and type of inflectional suffixes), not according to their associated syntactic frames. His terms, noun and substantive, are therefore not synonymous.

Pronouns 
Zuni uses overt pronouns for first and second persons. There are no third person pronouns. The pronouns distinguish three numbers (singular, dual and plural) and three cases (subject, object and possessive). In addition, some subject and possessive pronouns have different forms depending on whether they appear utterance-medially or utterance-finally (object pronouns do not occur utterance-medially). All pronoun forms are shown in the following table:

There is syncretism between dual and plural non-possessive forms in the first and second persons. Utterances with these pronouns are typically disambiguated by the fact that plural pronouns agree with plural-marked verb forms.

Sociolinguistics

 storytelling (Delapna:we) – Tedlock (1972)
 ceremonial speech – Newman (1955)
 slang – Newman (1955)

Names
Zuni adults are often known after the relationship between that adult and a child. For example, a person might be called "father of so-and-so", etc. The circumlocution is used to avoid using adult names, which have religious meanings and are very personal.

Orthography
There are twenty letters in the Zuni alphabet.

A , B, CH, D, E , H, I , K, L, Ł, M, N, O , P, S, T, U , W, Y, ʼ

 Double consonants indicate geminate (long) sounds, for instance the <nn> in shiwayanne "car", is pronounced [nː].
 Long vowels are indicated with a colon ꞉ following the vowel as the [aː] in wa'ma:we "animals".
 c is not part of the alphabet, although the digraph ch is. There are also other two letter combination sounds (like sh).
 c, r, g, v, z, x, q, f, and j are not used to write Zuni, except for the occasional borrowed word.
 it includes Ł, ł indicates IPA  (a voiceless alveolar lateral fricative, pronounced like h and l together)
 ʼ indicates IPA  (a glottal stop) – it is written medially and finally but not word-initially

This orthography was largely worked out by Curtis Cook.

Old orthographies
Linguists and anthropologists have created and used their own writing system for Zuni before the alphabet was standardized. One was developed for Zuni by linguist Stanley Newman (Newman 1954). This practical orthography essentially followed Americanist phonetic notation with the substitution of some uncommon letters with other letters or digraphs (two letter combinations). A further revised orthography is used in Dennis Tedlock's transcriptions of oral narratives.

A comparison of the systems is in the table below.

{| class="wikitable"
! Tedlock || Newman || Americanist || Current orthography || IPA
|-
| ʼ || / || ʔ || ʼ || 
|-
| ʼʼ || // || ʔʔ || ʼʼ || 
|-
| a || a || a || a || 
|-
| aa || a꞉ || aˑ || a꞉ || 
|-
| ch || ch || č || ch || 
|-
| cch || chch || čč || chh || 
|-
| e || e || e || e || 
|-
| ee || e꞉ || eˑ || e꞉ || 
|-
| i || i || i || i || 
|-
| ii || i꞉ || iˑ || i꞉ || 
|-
| h || j || h || h || 
|-
| hh || jj || hh || hh || 
|-
| k || k || k || k || 
|-
| kk || kk || kk || kk || 
|-
| kw || q || kʷ || kw || 
|-
| kkw || qq || kʷkʷ || kkw || 
|-
| l || l || l || l || 
|-
| ll || ll || ll || ll || 
|-
| lh || lh || ł || ł || 
|-
| llh || lhlh || łł || łł || 
|-
| m || m || m || m || 
|}

In Newman's orthography (used in his dictionary, Newman 1958), the symbols, ch, j, lh, q, sh, z, /, : replaced Americanist č, h, ł, kʷ, š, c, ʔ, and ˑ (used in Newman's grammar, Newman 1965).

Tedlock's orthography uses ʼ instead of Newman's / except at the beginning of words where it is not written.  Additionally, in Tedlock's system, long vowels are written doubled instead with a length mark ꞉ as in Newman's system (e.g. aa instead of a꞉) and h and kw are used instead of j and q.  Finally, Tedlock writes the following long consonants – cch, llh, ssh, tts – with a doubled initial letter instead of Newman's doubling of the digraphs – chch, lhlh, shsh – and kkw and tts are used instead of Newman's qq and zz.

Notes

References

Bunzel, Ruth L. (1932a). Zuñi origin myths. In 47th annual report of the Bureau of American Ethnology for the years 1929–1930 (pp. 545–609). Washington.
Bunzel, Ruth L. (1932b). Zuñi ritual poetry. In 47th annual report of the Bureau of American Ethnology for the years 1929–1930 (pp. 611–835). Washington.
Bunzel, Ruth L. (1933). Zuni texts. Publications of the American Ethnological Society (No. 15). New York: G.E. Steckert & Co. 
Bunzel, Ruth L. (1934). Zuni. In Handbook of American Indian languages (Vol. 3, pp. 383–515). Gluckstadt: J. J. Augustin.
Campbell, Lyle. (1997). American Indian languages: The historical linguistics of Native America. New York: Oxford University Press. .
Cannell, Joseph R. (2007). On the Language Family Classifications of Zuni [Online] Available: www.josephcannell.yahoo.com [2007, April 15]
Condie, Carol. (1973). Problems of a Chomskyan analysis of Zuni transitivity. International Journal of American Linguistics, 39, 207-223.
Cook, Curtis D. (1975). Nucleus and margin of Zuni clause types. Linguistics, 13 5-37.
Cushing, Frank Hamilton. (1975). Zuni breadstuff. Indian notes and monographs (Vol. 8). AMS Press.  
Davis, Nancy Yaw. (2000). The Zuni enigma. Norton. 
 Davis, Irvine. (1966). [Review of Zuni grammar by Stanley Newman]. International Journal of American Linguistics, 32, 82-84.
Dutton, Bertha P. (1983). American Indians of the Southwest.  Albuquerque: University of New Mexico Press.
Foster, Michael K. (1996). Language and the culture history of North America. In I. Goddard (Ed.) Handbook of North American Indians: Languages (Vol. 17, pp. 64–110). Washington: Smithsonian Institution.
Goddard, Ives. (1996). The classification of the native languages of North America. In I. Goddard (Ed.) Handbook of North American Indians: Languages (Vol. 17, pp. 290–323). Washington: Smithsonian Institution.
Granberry, Julian. (1967). Zuni syntax. (Doctoral dissertation, SUNY Buffalo).
Hickerson, Nancy P. (1975). Two studies of color: Implications for cross-cultural comparability of semantic categories.  In M. D. Kinkade, K. Hale, & O. Werner (Eds.), Linguistics and anthropology: In honor of C. F. Voegelin (pp. 317–330). The Peter De Ridder Press.
Hymes, Dell H. (1957). Some Penutian elements and the Penutian hypothesis. Southwestern Journal of Anthropology, 13, 69-87.
 Kroeber, Albert L. (1917). Zuñi kin and clan. Anthropological papers of the American Museum of Natural History (Vol. 18, Pt. 2). New York: The Trustees.
 Miller, Wick R. (1996). The ethnography of speaking. In I. Goddard (Ed.) Handbook of North American Indians: Languages (Vol. 17, pp. 222–243). Washington: Smithsonian Institution.
Miner, Kenneth L. (1986). Noun stripping and loose incorporation in Zuni. International Journal of American Linguistics, 52, 242-254.
Mithun, Marianne (Ed.). (1999). The languages of native North America. Cambridge: Cambridge University Press.
Newman, Stanley. (1954). A practical Zuni orthography. In J. Roberts & W. Smith (Eds.), Zuni law: A field of values (pp. 163–170). Papers of the Peabody Museum of American Archaeology and Ethnology (Vol. 43, No. 1). Cambridge, MA: Peabody Museum, Harvard University. 
Newman, Stanley. (1955). Vocabulary levels: Zuni sacred and slang usage. Southwestern Journal of Anthropology, 11, 345-354.
Newman, Stanley. (1958). Zuni dictionary. Indiana University research center publications (No. 6). Bloomington: Indiana University.
 Newman, Stanley. (1964). Comparison of Zuni and California Penutian. International Journal of American Linguistics, 30, 1-13.
Newman, Stanley. (1965). Zuni grammar. University of New Mexico publications in anthropology (No. 14). Albuquerque: University of New Mexico.
Newman, Stanley. (1967). Zuni grammar: Alternative solutions versus weaknesses. International Journal of American Linguistics, 33, 187-192.
Newman, Stanley. (1967). The Zuni verb 'to be'. In J. W. Verhaar (Ed.), Foundations of language, supplemental series (Vol. 1). The Humanities Press.
Newman, Stanley. (1996). Sketch of the Zuni language. In I. Goddard (Ed.) Handbook of North American Indians: Languages (Vol. 17, pp. 483–506). Washington: Smithsonian Institution.
Nichols, Lynn. (1990). Direct quotation and switch reference in Zuni. In Proceedings of the Berkeley Linguistics Society (No. 16, pp. 90–100).
Nichols, Lynn. (1993). Recovering Zuni auxiliaries and their role in event classification. Harvard Studies in Linguistics, 3, 92-108.
Nichols, Lynn. (1998). Topics in Zuni syntax. (Doctoral dissertation, Harvard).
 Parsons, Elsie Clews. (1927). Zuñi names and naming practices. The Journal of American Folklore, 36 (140), 171-176.
Stout, Carol. (1972). Zuni transitivity: A generative approach. (Doctoral dissertation, University of New Mexico).
 Tedlock, Dennis. (1972). Finding the center: Narrative poetry of the Zuni Indians. New York: Dial.
 Tedlock, Dennis. (1978). Coyote and Junco. In W. Bright (Ed.), Coyote stories (pp. 171–177). Chicago: The Chicago University Press.
 Tedlock, Dennis. (1983). The spoken word and the work of interpretation. Philadelphia: University of Pennsylvania.
 Tedlock, Dennis. (1999). Finding the center: The art of the Zuni storyteller (2nd ed.). Lincoln: University of Nebraska Press.
Walker, Willard. (1964). Reference, taxonomy and inflection in Zuni. (Doctoral dissertation, Cornell University).
Walker, Willard. (1966). [Review of Zuni grammar by Stanley Newman]. Language, 42 (1), 176-180.
Walker, Willard. (1966). Inflection and taxonomic structure in Zuni. International Journal of American Linguistics, 32 (3), 217-227.
Walker, Willard. (1979). Zuni semantic categories. In A. Ortiz (Ed.), Handbook of North American Indians: Southwest (Vol. 9, pp. 509–513). Washington, D.C.: Government Printing Office.
Walker, Willard. (1983). What Zuni is really like. In F. Agard, G. Kelley, A. Makkai, V. B. Makkai (Eds.), Essays in honor of Charles F. Hockett (pp. 551–562). Leiden: E. J. Brill.
Watts, Linda. (1992). Relational terminology at Zuni Pueblo: A social semiotic case study. (Doctoral dissertation, Arizona State University).
Yumitani, Yukihiro. (1987). A comparative sketch of Pueblo languages: Phonology. In Kansas working papers in linguistics (No. 12, pp. 119–139). University of Kansas.

External links

Zuni World View  "Linguistic and Ontological Implications of the Conceptual Presuppositions of the Zuni Worldview", HTML and PDF.
English-Zuni Word list
English-Zuni Conversational phrases
Zuni Bible Portions
Zuni (Intercontinental Dictionary Series)

Zuni culture
Indigenous languages of the Southwestern United States
Language isolates of North America
Indigenous languages of New Mexico
Indigenous languages of the North American Southwest
Language
Indigenous languages of Arizona
Pueblo linguistic area